Moorefield Township is one of the fifteen townships of Harrison County, Ohio, United States. As of the 2010 census the population was 403.

Geography
Located in the southern part of the county, it borders the following townships:
Nottingham Township - north
Cadiz Township - northeast
Athens Township - east
Flushing Township, Belmont County - south
Freeport Township - west
Washington Township - northwest

No municipalities are located in Moorefield Township, although the unincorporated community of Piedmont lies in the western part of the township.

Name and history
Statewide, the only other Moorefield Township is located in Clark County.

Government
The township is governed by a three-member board of trustees, who are elected in November of odd-numbered years to a four-year term beginning on the following January 1. Two are elected in the year after the presidential election and one is elected in the year before it. There is also an elected township fiscal officer, who serves a four-year term beginning on April 1 of the year after the election, which is held in November of the year before the presidential election. Vacancies in the fiscal officership or on the board of trustees are filled by the remaining trustees.

References

External links
County website

Townships in Harrison County, Ohio
Townships in Ohio